Praskozorje ( – "dawn") is a Bosnian panslavistic movement. As noted on the official website, the movement was founded to promote cultural revival of the Bosnian people and disappearance of ethno-religious hatred among different (south) Slavic ethnicities.

History
The movement was founded in 2009 by a group of young like-minded people in Sarajevo, the capital of Bosnia and Herzegovina.

Ideology
Praskozorje insists on Slavic revival of the country through promotion of the medieval period when Bosnian state (banate and kingdom) was founded and achieved its cultural and economic peak while also insisting on restoring old Slavic traditions, beliefs and mythology. The movement rejects vision of the country provided by the politicians in three modern constitutive peoples. Members also show negative stance towards capitalism, greater Serbia ideology, greater Croatia ideology, Islamism, Neo-Ottomanism and Neoimperialism among Bosnian (and other Slavic nations) itself, promoting the idea about free Slavic nations and Slavic unity.

With the movement is associated a Slavic Native Faith group called "Circle of Svarog" that was created in 2011.

References

External links
Official website

Ethnic groups in Bosnia and Herzegovina
Modern paganism in Europe
Pan-Slavism
Slavic neopaganism
Modern pagan organizations established in the 2000s